Chonglou  is a township-level division of Taishan City, Jiangmen, Guangdong, China.

See also
List of township-level divisions of Guangdong

References

Towns in Guangdong
Taishan, Guangdong